The 1976–77 UEFA Cup was the sixth season of the UEFA Cup, a club football competition organised by UEFA (the Union of European Football Associations). It was won by Greek club AEK Athens, who beat Juventus of Italy in the two-legged final;  AEK Athens won one leg of the tie, which finished 2–1 on aggregate. It was the first time that a team from Southern Europe had won the competition.

First round

|}

First leg

Second leg

Schalke 04 won 5–4 on aggregate.

Slovan Bratislava won 8–0 on aggregate.

Basel won 5–3 on aggregate.

Kaiserslautern won 11–1 on aggregate.

AEK Athens won 3–2 on aggregate.

Manchester United won 2–1 on aggregate.

Austria Salzburg won 5–2 on aggregate.

Barcelona won 5-4 on aggregate.

Wisła Kraków won 4-2 on aggregate.

Derby County won 16–1 on aggregate.

Milan won 2–1 on aggregate.

Eintracht Braunschweig won 7–1 on aggregate.

Espanyol won 4–3 on aggregate.

Feyenoord won 4–2 on aggregate.

Videoton won 5–2 on aggregate.

Grasshoppers won 9–0 on aggregate.

Hibernian won 1–0 on aggregate.

Budapest Honvéd won 2–1 on aggregate.

Köln won 3–1 on aggregate.

Öster won 4–3 on aggregate.

Magdeburg won 4–3 on aggregate.

Juventus won 2–1 on aggregate.

Molenbeek won 7–0 on aggregate.

Queens Park Rangers won 11–0 on aggregate.

Lokeren won 6–1 on aggregate.

Akademik Sofia won 3–2 on aggregate.

Shakhtar Donetsk won 4–1 on aggregate.

Sportul Studențesc won 4–2 on aggregate.

Wacker Innsbruck won 7–1 on aggregate.

Dinamo Zagreb won 4–0 on aggregate.

Athletic Bilbao won 5–1 on aggregate.

Red Star Belgrade won 5–3 on aggregate.

Second round

|}

First leg

Second leg

AEK Athens won 5–2 on aggregate.

Milan won 5–4 on aggregate.

2–2 on aggregate; Red Star Belgrade won on away goals.

Barcelona won 3–2 on aggregate.

Athletic Bilbao won 4–2 on aggregate.

Espanyol won 3–2 on aggregate.

Öster won 4–3 on aggregate.

Videoton won 2–1 on aggregate.

Feyenoord won 7–2 on aggregate.

Köln won 5–2 on aggregate.

Magdeburg won 4–2 on aggregate.

Juventus won 3–1 on aggregate.

Shakhtar Donetsk won 6–2 on aggregate.

Queens Park Rangers won 8–5 on aggregate.

Schalke 04 won 5–0 on aggregate.

2–2 on aggregate; Molenbeek won 5–4 on penalties.

Third round

|}

First leg

Second leg

3–3 on aggregate; AEK Athens won on away goals.

Athletic Bilbao won 5–4 on aggregate.

Feyenoord won 3–0 on aggregate.

Juventus won 3–1 on aggregate.

Magdeburg won 5–1 on aggregate.

Barcelona won 8–1 on aggregate.

4–4 on aggregate; Queens Park Rangers won on away goals.

Molenbeek won 2–1 on aggregate.

Quarter-finals

|}

First leg

Second leg

Athletic Bilbao won 4–3 on aggregate.

Molenbeek won 2–1 on aggregate.

Juventus won 4–1 on aggregate.

3–3 on aggregate; AEK Athens won 7–6 on penalties.

Semi-finals

|}

First leg

Second leg

1–1 on aggregate; Athletic Bilbao won on away goals.

Juventus won 5–1 on aggregate.

Final

First leg

Second leg

2–2 on aggregate; Juventus won on away goals.

References

External links
 1976–77 All matches UEFA Cup – season at UEFA website
 Official Site
 Results at RSSSF.com
 All scorers 1976–77 UEFA Cup according to protocols UEFA
 1976/77 UEFA Cup - results and line-ups (archive)

UEFA Cup seasons
2